Rosthern is a town at the juncture of Highway 11 and Highway 312 in the central area of Saskatchewan, Canada. It is located roughly halfway between the cities of Prince Albert and Saskatoon.

History
Mennonite settlers, led by Gerhard Ens, began arriving in the area around 1890, with the establishment of the Qu’Appelle, Long Lake & Saskatchewan Railway to Prince Albert. The post office was established in 1893, and by 1898 the community achieved village status. In 1903, Rosthern was incorporated as a town.

There are several apocryphal versions of the story about how the town got its name. One is that in the late 1880s when the railway ran through from Regina to Prince Albert a man by the name of Ross drowned in the creek that flows through the town. Terne is old English for tarn meaning a pool, and the name stuck. In all likelihood, however, the town's name echoes an old world name brought over by a homesick worker on the railroad, in this case that of Rostherne, a village in the United Kingdom.

Demographics 

Attractions

The Seager Wheeler Farm, a National Historic Site of Canada, is 7 km east of Rosthern. The Rosthern Mennonite Heritage Museum (c. 1909-10) is a Municipal Heritage Property on the Canadian Register of Historic Places.

There is also a public library, many parks and walking trails.

Recreation
In addition to the nearby Valley Regional Park with an 18-hole grass green golf course, there are two ball-diamonds, two indoor hockey rinks, a curling rink, bowling alley, and three school gyms. A new outdoor swimming pool completed in 2005. Rosthern is also home to the Youth Farm Bible Camp.

Popular sporting activities include baseball, soccer, badminton, basketball, hockey, swimming, volleyball, floor hockey and Tae Kwon Do.

Churches
Rosthern is home to over ten churches including Mennonite, Ukrainian Orthodox, Swedenborgian, Pentecostal, Anglican, Roman Catholic, Ukrainian Catholic, Lutheran, Seventh-day Adventist, Christian & Missionary Alliance, and Baptist.

Notable people

Alan Joseph Adamson, politician
William Benjamin Bashford, politician
Bill Braden, politician
George Braden, 2nd Premier of Northwest Territories
Russ Brayshaw, hockey player
Hulda Regehr Clark, naturopath
Onésime Dorval, educator
Wayne Elhard, politician
Isaak Elias, politician
Gerhard Ens, town founder
Jerry Friesen, football player
Ben Heppner, politician
Jim Hrycuik, hockey player
Roger Kortko, hockey player
George Langley, politician
Frederick Loveroff, artist
Archibald Peter McNab, 6th Lieutenant Governor of Saskatchewan
Myles Morin, politician
Earle Morris, curler
Barbara Nickel, writer
Erdman Penner, Disney screenwriter
Jim Penner, businessman and politician
J. D. Denis Pelletier, judge
Richie Regehr, hockey player
Robyn Regehr, hockey player
Jeanne Thomarat, artist
Maurice Vellacott, politician
Seager Wheeler, author
Art Wiebe, hockey player
Berny Wiens, politician

See also
List of communities in Saskatchewan
List of rural municipalities in Saskatchewan

References

External links

Towns in Saskatchewan
Rosthern No. 403, Saskatchewan
Division No. 15, Saskatchewan
Mennonitism in Saskatchewan
Russian Mennonite diaspora in Canada